Kerch Marine Trade Seaport is one of the oldest ports of Black Sea (and Sea of Azov) located in the city of Kerch on the eastern shores of Kerch peninsula at Kerch Bay.

The port has 10 piers.

Information
Port of Kerch is located in close proximity to the Black Sea waterways of oil transportation, international transport corridors and the Bosphorus (the exit to the Mediterranean Sea).

The port is located on the shores of the Kerch -freezing bay.
On the coast of the Kerch Strait coldest months - January and February. The prevailing wind - NE. The port is open for navigation all year round.
The port provides cargo-handling services and storage in open areas, with a total area of 140 000 m2. and in covered warehouses of 12 000 m2.

See also
 Kerch Fishing Port

References

External links
 Official website

Buildings and structures in Kerch
Kerch
Ports of Crimea
Enterprises of Kerch